The 34th District of the Iowa Senate is located in eastern Iowa, and is currently composed of Linn County.

Current elected officials
Liz Mathis is the senator currently representing the 34th District.

The area of the 34th District contains two Iowa House of Representatives districts:
The 67th District (represented by Eric Gjerde)
The 68th District (represented by Molly Donahue)

The district is also located in Iowa's 1st congressional district, which is represented by Ashley Hinson.

Past senators
The district has previously been represented by:

Bass Van Gilst, 1983–1984
John Neighbour, 1985
John Peterson, 1986–1992
Tony Bisignano, 1993–1996
Matt McCoy, 1997–2002
Dick Dearden, 2003–2012
Liz Mathis, 2013–present

See also
Iowa General Assembly
Iowa Senate

References

34